Kukavica may refer to:
 Kukavica, a mountain in Serbia
 Kukavica, Pljevlja, a village in Montenegro
 Kukavica (Vladičin Han), a village in Serbia
 Kukavica (Vlasotince), a village in Serbia